Nurlan Abduldauly Iskakov (Nūrlan Äbdıldaūly Ysqaqov) was the Minister of Environmental Protection in the Government of Kazakhstan.

References

Living people
Government ministers of Kazakhstan
Place of birth missing (living people)
1963 births